Rafael Emilio Gómez (13 February 1900 – death date unknown) was a Dominican Negro league pitcher in the 1920s.

A native of Santiago, Dominican Republic, Gómez played for the Cuban Stars (East) in 1929. In 12 recorded appearances, he posted 7.53 ERA over 63.1 innings.

References

External links
 and Baseball-Reference Black Baseball Stats and Seamheads

1900 births
Year of death missing
Place of death missing
Cuban Stars (East) players
Baseball pitchers
Dominican Republic baseball players
Sportspeople from Santiago